Moving Malcolm is a Canadian comedy-drama film, directed by Benjamin Ratner and released in 2003.

The film stars Ratner as Gene Maxwell, a man who is forced to piece his life back together after being dumped at the altar by his fiancé Liz (Elizabeth Berkley), but is asked after the wedding to help her move her father Malcolm (John Neville) to a new apartment in a seniors home. The cast also includes Jay Brazeau and Babz Chula as Gene's parents George and Gisha and Rebecca Harker as his autistic sister Jolea, as well as Linda Sorenson, Nicholas Lea and Tom Scholte in supporting roles.

Ratner acknowledged that the film was partially autobiographical; although Ratner was never personally jilted by a fiancé, he based Gene Maxwell's family on his own.

The film premiered at the 2003 Montreal World Film Festival, where it received an honorable mention from the Best First Feature award jury.

Awards
Harker won the Vancouver Film Critics Circle award for Best Supporting Actress in a Canadian Film, and was nominated for Best Supporting Actress at the 2004 Leo Awards.

References

External links

2003 films
2003 comedy-drama films
Canadian comedy-drama films
English-language Canadian films
2003 comedy films
2003 drama films
2000s English-language films
2000s Canadian films